State elections were held in South Australia on 29 April 1944. All 39 seats in the South Australian House of Assembly were up for election. The incumbent Liberal and Country League government led by Premier of South Australia Thomas Playford IV defeated the opposition Australian Labor Party led by Leader of the Opposition Robert Richards.

Background
Labor won an additional five seats totaling 16 seats − the highest number of seats won by Labor from the 1933 election through to the 1959 election, an effort not even outdone at the 1953 election where Labor won 53 percent of the statewide two-party vote but the LCL retained government with the assistance of the Playmander − an electoral malapportionment that also saw a clear majority of the statewide two-party vote won by Labor while failing to form government in 1953, 1962 and 1968.

The election was the first where the two-party vote had been retrospectively calculated. Unusually a wartime opposition won a clear majority of the two-party vote.

Turnout crashed to 50 percent at the 1941 election, triggering the government to institute compulsory voting from this election.

The Communist Party of Australia in South Australia recorded their highest vote at this election − 19.4 percent (2,500 votes) for candidate Alf Watt in the seat of Adelaide. The party contested one other seat at the election, Prospect, on 15.7 percent. The party only contested a select few seats at each election, the first at the 1930 election and the last at the 1977 election.

Results

|}

 The primary vote figures were from contested seats, while the state-wide two-party-preferred vote figures were estimated from all seats.

See also
Results of the South Australian state election, 1944 (House of Assembly)
Candidates of the 1944 South Australian state election
Members of the South Australian House of Assembly, 1944-1947
Members of the South Australian Legislative Council, 1944–1947
Playmander

References
History of South Australian elections 1857-2006, volume 1: ECSA
State and federal election results  in Australia since 1890
The ‘Playmander’, Its origins, operation and effect on South Australia

Specific

Elections in South Australia
1944 elections in Australia
1940s in South Australia
April 1944 events